Olbas Oil is a remedy, of Swiss origin, for congestion in the chest and nose, some hayfever relief (in certain cases) and also for muscle ache via massage. It is made from a mixture of several different essential oils and has been marketed since before 1916. The name is a contraction of Oleum Basileum, "oil from Basel".

Risk of eye injury
Olbas Oil's packaging is similar to that of eye drops, with the result that people occasionally administer it onto their eyes in error, causing injury.

The introduction of Olbas Oil into a child's eye contrary to the product's instructions for use, was noted to result in a range of  adverse effects including corneal scarring.

Available as
There are several trademarked olbas oil products available
 Olbas Oil
 Olbas for children
 Olbas inhaler
 Olbas Pastilles
 Olbas Menthol Lozenges 
 Olbas bath

Active ingredients
Active ingredients are listed as;
Cajeput oil
Clove oil
Eucalyptus oil
Juniper berry oil
Levomenthol 
Methyl salicylate (Wintergreen oil)
Peppermint oil

References

Essential oils